Danske Færger (English. Danish Ferries), styled as Færgen (English: The Ferry) was a Danish ferry company. It was created on 1 October 2011 through the merger of Bornholmstrafikken and Scandlines' internal Danish activities. The company was a 50/50 partnership between the Danish state and Clipper Group. The company was first formed in April 2008 as Nordic Ferry Services. In 2018 Danske Færger was sold to Molslinjen.

Routes
As of 2001, the company operated eight routes:
 AlsFærgen 
 (Bøjden – Fynshav)
 BornholmerFærgen 
 (Ystad – Rønne) 
 (Køge – Rønne) 
 (Sassnitz D – Rønne)
 FanøFærgen 
 (Esbjerg – Nordby)
 LangelandsFærgen 
 (Spodsbjerg – Tårs) 
 SamsøFærgen 
 (Kalundborg – Kolby Kås) 
 (Sælvig – Hou)

References

Ferry companies of Denmark
Transport companies established in 2008
Companies based in Bornholm
2008 establishments in Denmark